Year's Best SF 8 is a science fiction anthology edited by David G. Hartwell and Kathryn Cramer that was published in 2003.  It is the eighth in the Year's Best SF series.

Contents

The book itself, as well as each of the stories, has a short
introduction by the editors.

Bruce Sterling: "In Paradise" (Originally in F&SF, 2002)
Michael Swanwick: "Slow Life" (Originally in Analog, 2002)
Eleanor Arnason: "Knapsack Poems" (Originally in Asimov's, 2002)
Geoffrey A. Landis: "At Dorado" (Originally in Asimov's, 2002)
Robert Reed: "Coelacanths" (Originally in F&SF, 2002)
 Ken Wharton: "Flight Correction" (Originally in Analog, 2002)
Robert Sheckley: "Shoes" (Originally in F&SF, 2002)
Charles Sheffield: "The Diamond Drill" (Originally in Analog, 2002)
Ursula K. Le Guin: "The Seasons of the Ansarac" (Originally in The Infinite Matrix, 2002)
Richard Chwedyk: "A Few Kind Words for A. E. Van Vogt" (Originally in Tales of the Unanticipated, 2002)
Charles Stross: "Halo" (Originally in Asimov's, 2002)
Terry Bisson: "I Saw the Light" (Originally in Sci Fiction, 2002)
A. M. Dellamonica: "A Slow Day at the Gallery" (Originally in Asimov's, 2002)
Paul Di Filippo: "Ailoura" (Originally in Once Upon a Galaxy, 2002)
 J. R. Dunn: "The Names of All the Spirits" (Originally in Sci Fiction, 2002)
Carol Emshwiller: "Grandma" (Originally in F&SF, 2002)
Neal Asher: "Snow in the Desert" (Originally in Spectrum SF, 2002)
Greg Egan: "Singleton" (Originally in Interzone, 2002)
 Robert Onopa: "Geropods" (Originally in F&SF, 2002)
Jack Williamson: "Afterlife" (Originally in F&SF, 2002)
Gene Wolfe: "Shields of Mars" (Originally in Mars Probes, 2002)
Nancy Kress: "Patent Infringement" (Originally in Asimov's, 2002)
Michael Moorcock: "Lost Sorceress of the Silent Citadel" (Originally in Mars Probes, 2002)

External links

 The Infinite Matrix

2003 anthologies
Year's Best SF anthology series
Eos Books books
2000s science fiction works